The Chiang family is a political family of the Republic of China with Wu Chinese background from Zhejiang province. Members of a prosperous family of salt merchants, the Chiang family held senior positions in Chinese politics first on the Chinese mainland and then in Taiwan after 1949.

Members include Chinese Nationalist politician, revolutionary and military leader Chiang Kai-shek, who served as the leader of the Republic of China from 1928 to 1975. Chiang Ching-kuo, President of the Republic of China (1978–1988), Chiang Hsiao-yen, Vice Chairman of the Kuomintang (2009–2014), and more.

Chiang Kai-shek and Chiang Ching-kuo, who have been presidents of the Republic of China, are often called collectively as “Two Chiangs”.

Origin

Offices held
Chiang Kai-shek (1887–1975)
Chairman of the National Government of the Republic of China (1928–1931, 1943–1948)
President of the Republic of China (1948–1949, 1950–1975)
Chiang Ching-kuo (1910–1988)
Premier of the Republic of China (1972–1978)
President of the Republic of China (1978–1988). Son of Chiang Kai-shek.
Chiang Hsiao-yen (1942–)
Ministry of Foreign Affairs of the Republic of China (1996–1997) 
Member of the Legislative Yuan (2002–2012)
Vice Chairman of the Kuomintang (2009–2014)
Chiang Hsiao-wu (1945–1991)
President of the state-run Broadcasting Corporation of China (1980–1986)
Chiang Wan-an (1978–)
Member of the Legislative Yuan (2016–2022)
Mayor of Taipei (2022–)
Demos Chiang 蔣友柏 (1976–)

 Chairman, DEM Inc.

Family tree

See also
 Four big families of the Republic of China

References 

Political families of China
Chiang Kai-shek